Sligo Airport is located in Strandhill, County Sligo,  west of Sligo, at the end of the R277 road, in Ireland. The airport is a small regional airport and has no scheduled routes.

Introduction and history
Sligo Airport is the home of the Sligo Aero Club (a Registered Training Facility) and the northwest base for the Irish Coastguard. Private flight training, skydiving and charity jumps are all operated from the airport.

In 2002 a Euroceltic Airways Fokker F27 aircraft carrying the band Aslan overshot the runway and the nose dipped into the sea. The accident caused no casualties.

Euroceltic was operating the Government of Ireland public service obligation subsidy scheme for the route to Dublin at the time. The airline collapsed shortly afterwards and Aer Arann operated the route for the remainder of the contract. The 2005 contract tender was offered to Loganair who declined it. Aer Arann subsequently negotiated the operation of the contract with the Government.

On 21 February 2007 the Irish Government announced that it would be giving €8.5 million to the airport in capital grant money, to upgrade the runway and add approach lighting and safety enhancements. However, the proposed runway extension would have required infill and the erection of gantries across part of the adjacent protected beach. The plan drew much local criticism and almost 400 objections from residents of the local area, fisheries groups, the Department of Environment, An Taisce and Birdwatch Ireland. The planning permission was quashed on the third attempt by a high court judge on justification grounds.

Until the end of 2008 Aer Arann operated flights to Manchester Airport.
In 2011 the airport lost its only scheduled route, operated by Aer Arann, to Dublin Airport twice daily. The final flight was on 21 July 2011.

The Irish Government-commissioned Value for Money Review of Exchequer Funding on the Regional Airports Programme recommended the ending of operational subvention to the airport and the ending of the PSO designation, citing poor performance, growing operational costs and development of alternative transport connections to the region.

Since the end of passenger flights in 2011, the airport has continued to be a base for the Irish Coast Guard Rescue Helicopter (Rescue 118). General aviation also operates at the airport, including aircraft such as Cessnas, Pipers, and Beechcraft. Sligo Aero Club continues to operate from the airport. The airport receives occasional visits from jets which are suited to land on the shorter runway.

CHC Ireland Search and Rescue Base
Sligo Airport is the home of Rescue 118, the Irish Coast Guard Helicopter which has served the north-west of Ireland since 2004. The base operates a Sikorsky S-92A helicopter 24 hours, 365 days a year (which replaced the previously used S-61N on 1 July 2013). It deals with many types of incidents, such as cliff rescues, hospital transfers and dealing with sick patients off coastal islands.

Accidents and incidents
On 2 November 2002, a Euroceltic Fokker F-27 (registered G-ECAT) was coming in to land on Runway 10, after a routine flight from Dublin, when it overran the runway. After landing nosewheel first almost halfway down the runway, the aircraft eventually came to rest with the nose of the aircraft in the sea, and the main landing gear on an embankment. Passengers were evacuated and there were no reported casualties. However the plane was declared a write-off by the company two weeks later, due to the saltwater damage to the cockpit. The cause of the accident was a "fast, low approach, leading to the aircraft landing late, beyond the normal touch down point, thereby making it impossible to stop the aircraft on the remaining runway available". The pilot at the time had been placed under restrictions following a CAA audit of Euroceltic, as noted in paragraph 1.18.2 of the AAIU report. The chief pilot of Euroceltic "was using an instructor tone and coaching" the pilot during landing, as noted in paragraph 2.1 of the report. The AAIU report also notes in paragraph 2.1 that "Whilst the meteorological conditions were difficult they were well within the limits for the type of approach and there was very little crosswind component" and in paragraph 2.2 that "there was no significant standing water on the runway during the landing".

References

External links

 Official website

Transport in County Sligo
Airports in the Republic of Ireland